Stuart Edward Reynolds FLS FRES is a British scientist known for his work on insect and microbes.

Reynolds holds an Emeritus Chair at the University of Bath and is a past president of the Royal Entomological Society (2010–12).

References

Fellows of the Linnean Society of London
Fellows of the Royal Entomological Society
Presidents of the Royal Entomological Society
Living people
Year of birth missing (living people)